Mixophyes hihihorlo, also known as the Namosado barred frog, is a species of frog in the family Myobatrachidae. It is endemic to eastern New Guinea. Its natural habitats are subtropical or tropical moist montane forests.

References

Mixophyes
Amphibians of Papua New Guinea
Taxonomy articles created by Polbot
Amphibians described in 1990